Liudmila Udobkina (born  in Oryol) is a Russian bobsledder.

Career
Udobkina competed at the 2014 Winter Olympics for Russia. She teamed with driver Olga Stulneva as the Russia-1 sled  in the two-woman event, finishing 9th.

As of April 2014, her best showing at the World Championships is 11th, in 2013.

Udobkina made her World Cup debut in November 2004. As of April 2014, her best World Cup finish is 4th, coming in a team event at Konigssee in 2011-12. Her best finish in an Olympic discipline is 5th, which she achieved three times.

In December 2017, she was one of eleven Russian athletes who were banned for life from the Olympics by the International Olympic Committee, after doping offences at the 2014 Winter Olympics.

References

1984 births
Living people
Olympic bobsledders of Russia
Sportspeople from Oryol
Bobsledders at the 2014 Winter Olympics
Russian female bobsledders
Doping cases in bobsleigh
Russian sportspeople in doping cases